Lieutenant Colonel Robert George Scott, VC, DSO (22 April 1857 – 3 October 1918) was an English recipient of the Victoria Cross, the highest and most prestigious award for gallantry in the face of the enemy that can be awarded to British and Commonwealth forces.

Early military career
Scott was born on 22 April 1857 at Whittlesey, near Peterborough, Cambridgeshire. He was the son of Fleet-Surgeon Robert Charles Scott (RN) and Mary Elizabeth Scott, and entered Epsom College in 1870 and joined Granville House. He was an active member of the College Corps. After leaving College in 1871 he went on to join the Cape Mountain Riflemen in 1876. He served in the Frontier Wars of 1877 and the Zulu War of 1878–9.

Details of Victoria Cross
Scott was 21 years old, and a sergeant in the Cape Mounted Riflemen, Cape Colonial Forces during the Morosi's Mountain 1879 Campaign when the following deed took place for which he was awarded the VC.

On 8 April 1879 during an attack on Morosi's Mountain, South Africa, Sergeant Scott volunteered to throw time-fuse shells as hand grenades over a wall of stone barricades from behind which the enemy were bringing heavy fire to bear on the Colonial troops. Sergeant Scott made his men take cover in case the shells burst prematurely before making two attempts to throw shells over it. At the second attempt the shell exploded almost in his hands blowing his right hand to pieces and wounding him severely in the leg.

Later career
Scott later served in South Africa during the Second Boer War, where he was in command of the Scott's Railway Guards, attached to the Kimberley Light Horse. The Railway Guards did work on the Orange River – Kimberley line, and was engaged by the enemy several times during the war. Following the end of hostilities, Scott left Cape Town for England in June 1902. He later served in the First World War. He later achieved the rank of lieutenant colonel.

References

Monuments to Courage (David Harvey, 1999)
The Register of the Victoria Cross (This England, 1997)

External links 
 

1857 births
1918 deaths
British recipients of the Victoria Cross
People from Peterborough
South African Army officers
Companions of the Distinguished Service Order
British military personnel of the Second Boer War
People of the Basuto Gun War
British colonial army soldiers
People educated at Epsom College
South African military personnel of World War I